Frank Craighill was one of the founding partners of the sports marketing firm ProServ.  ProServ was created in 1970 in Washington, D.C. by attorney and former professional tennis player and U.S. Davis Cup captain Donald Dell and Craighill. Their first clients were Dell’s Davis Cup teammates Arthur Ashe and Stan Smith. At its peak, ProServ represented more than 200 professional athletes and coaches, including Michael Jordan, Patrick Ewing, Stan Smith, Arthur Ashe, and Jimmy Connors. The company also managed and promoted professional sporting events and created ProServ Television to handle sports television production and rights representation.

References

American sports agents
Year of birth missing (living people)
Living people
Place of birth missing (living people)